Caldwell County is the name of several counties in the United States:

 Caldwell County, Kentucky 
 Caldwell County, Missouri 
 Caldwell County, North Carolina 
 Caldwell County, Texas 
 Caldwell Parish, Louisiana